Pierre Le Corre (born 3 February 1990) is a French triathlete. He competed in the men's event at the 2016 Summer Olympics and is the winner of 2022 World Triathlon Long Distance Championships.

In 2019, he won the gold medal in the men's triathlon at the 2019 Military World Games held in Wuhan, China.

References

External links
 

1990 births
Living people
French male triathletes
Olympic triathletes of France
Triathletes at the 2016 Summer Olympics
Place of birth missing (living people)
20th-century French people
21st-century French people